The 1998 NCAA Division I Indoor Track and Field Championships were contested to determine the individual and team national champions of men's and women's NCAA collegiate indoor track and field events in the United States after the 1997–98 season, the 34th annual meet for men and 16th annual meet for women.

The championships were again held at the RCA Dome in Indianapolis, Indiana.

Defending champions Arkansas again won the men's team title, the Razorbacks' fourteenth overall and fourteenth in fifteen years.

Texas won the women's team title, the Longhorns' fourth and first since 1990.

Qualification
All teams and athletes from Division I indoor track and field programs were eligible to compete for this year's individual and team titles.

Team standings 
 Note: Top 10 only
 Scoring: 6 points for a 1st-place finish in an event, 4 points for 2nd, 3 points for 3rd, 2 points for 4th, and 1 point for 5th
 (DC) = Defending Champions

Men's title
 65 teams scored at least one point

Women's title
 62 teams scored at least one point

References

NCAA Indoor Track and Field Championships
Ncaa Indoor Track And Field Championships
Ncaa Indoor Track And Field Championships